Frederick George "Fred" Schemanske (April 28, 1903 – February 18, 1960), nicknamed "Buck", was a Major League Baseball player who played for the Washington Senators in . He played in two games, one as a pitcher and one as a pinch hitter.

Singles in his only two at-bats left Schemanske with a rare MLB career batting average of 1.000.

External links

1903 births
1960 deaths
Major League Baseball pitchers
Baseball players from Detroit
Washington Senators (1901–1960) players
Evansville Evas players
Indianapolis Indians players
Quincy Indians players